The NBA 2K League (NBA2KL or simply 2K League) is an esports league joint venture between the National Basketball Association (NBA) and Take-Two Interactive. The league was announced in 2017 with its inaugural season taking place in 2018. There are 22 NBA teams that have teams, with a few independent teams also competing.

Broadcast partners 
On April 18, 2018, the NBA 2K League and Twitch announced a multiyear partnership to live stream all games. The inaugural season began on May 1, 2018, and on August 25, 2018, Knicks Gaming won the inaugural 2K League championship. For season 2, the rights to live stream the league's games went to YouTube and Twitch the second season began on April 16, 2019, and ended on August 3, with T-Wolves Gaming winning the championship.

NBA 2K and ESPN agreed to broadcast the games on ESPN2 and the ESPN App for the league's third season. The third season was planned to start on March 31, 2020, but the season was postponed to May 5, 2020, due to the COVID-19 pandemic with the first 15 weeks being played remotely, including the Ticket, the final in-season tournament.

In 2022 Stadium, NBA TV and the league agreed to broadcast select championship games

History and format
The inaugural season lasted for 17 weeks, beginning with the tip-off tournament from May 1–5, with the first weekly matchups taking place on May 11–12. There was an additional two tournaments during the season before the playoffs began on August 17, concluding with the NBA 2K League Finals on August 25. All games were live-streamed on Twitch and available to view on demand after the live broadcasts.

The league used Pro-Am mode for the games, which consisted of 5-on-5 matches where players used archetypes with preset skills instead of their own MyPlayer or NBA players to keep the ratings similar to everyone.

A special build of the newest NBA 2K game is used for the league, with equipment provided by Alienware and Intel. HyperX is the league's headset sponsor, while Scuf Gaming provides controllers for all matches. To go along with the league sponsors, each team also has various sponsors and displays the logos of the sponsors on their in-game uniforms. All games are played at the NBA 2K League Studio in New York.

In September 2020, the league designed a new draft system for the 2021 season.

In August 2021, the league announced that in-person events would return to play during the 2021 playoffs, which was held August 26–28, 2021. Also in August, the league announced its first all-star game that was played on September 25.

For the fifth season, the league removed the traditional league play in favor of extra tournaments that would help eventually determine the champion. Each team will still play roughly the same amount of games as they would have, but now each game has more stakes than before. The season will consist of six tournaments throughout the season followed by the playoffs in Indianapolis, Indiana. Only one of the tournaments, the Banner Chain, as well as the playoffs, will feature exclusively league teams. The other tournaments can feature non league teams, including amateur players. The season will include 3v3 tournaments to allow amateurs a chance to play against the pros.

Player eligibility and benefits

Initial season 
In order to qualify for the league draft, a player needed to be over the age of 18 and own NBA 2K on either PlayStation 4 or Xbox One. Players had to win a number of games in Pro-Am mode and submit an application. Following that, the players who qualified participated in a combine that ran from February 2–21, 2018. Only a select number of applicants received invites to the draft. The NBA 2k league has announced a new tryout process for the upcoming 2021 season.

All players signed six-month contracts and will have their relocation and housing costs covered by the league, as well as benefits such as medical insurance and a retirement plan. Food, transportation, and housing will also be covered during the season when teams travel for games.

Players drafted in the first round will make $35,000, while the rest of the players will make $32,000. There will be four other opportunities throughout the season to win money as $1 million will be split between three tournaments and the league championship. Players are also allowed to sign endorsement deals to earn extra income.

Teams
On December 11, 2017, the official logo for the NBA 2K League was revealed, with the logos for each of the 17 teams being revealed over the course of the following days. On August 15, 2018, it was announced that the league would expand to 21 teams in 2019 with the addition of teams from Atlanta, Brooklyn, Los Angeles, and Minnesota. The league grew to 23 teams in 2020 with the additions of Charlotte and Gen.G, the first team outside of North America. The league expanded to Mexico in 2022 with the addition of Dux Gaming, who became the 24th team in the league. The league will expand to Australia in 2023 with the introduction of NBL Oz Gaming, operated by Australia's National Basketball League, as the 25th team.

References

External links
Official website

 
2017 establishments in the United States
Sports leagues established in 2017